Highway 735 is a highway in the Canadian province of Saskatchewan. It runs from Highway 627 near Morse to Range Road 2280 near Boharm and Sevenmile.

See also 
Roads in Saskatchewan
Transportation in Saskatchewan

References 

735